M Carinae (HD 88981) is a solitary star in the constellation Carina. It has an apparent magnitude of +5.154, making it faintly visible to the naked eye under ideal and is located approximately 310 light-years from Earth. With a heliocentric radial velocity of   M Carinae is drifting closer to the Solar System.

M Car has a stellar classification of  kA8 mF4 III which indicates that it has the calcium K-line and surface temperature of an A8 star and the metallic lines of an evolved F-type giant that has just exhausted hydrogen fusion at its core. At present M Car has 2.14 times the mass of the Sun but has mildly expanded to 4.45 times its girth.

References

Carina (constellation)
A-type giants
Carinae, M
PD-65 01273
088981
050083
4025
Am stars